Jens Hansen may refer to:

Jens Hoyer Hansen (1940–1999), Danish-born New Zealand jeweller
Jens Jørgen Hansen (born 1939), Danish former football player and manager
Jens Kristian Hansen (born 1971), Faroese football player
Jens Marni Hansen (born 1974), Faroese singer, songwriter, composer and musician
Jens Peter Hansen (1927–1996), Danish amateur footballer
Jens Christian Hansen (1932–2014), Norwegian geographer
Jens Smedegaard Hansen (born 1957), Danish Olympic sprinter